With a Twist... is a 1997 album by Todd Rundgren. Asked to produce an album of new versions of his older singles, Rundgren decided to record the songs in Bossa nova style with elements of Exotica, complete with tropical bird call effects at the beginning of "Hello, It's Me" similar to Martin Denny's recording Quiet Village. Continuing the theme, Rundgren toured theaters with a replica of a tiki bar, the performers on a very small stage with selected audience members being seated at tables also on the theater stage, and being served drinks by the monitor engineer/bartender. The performers never acknowledged the larger theater audience, and the show ended when the last "bar patron" left the stage.

A new version of "Love of the Common Man" from Faithful, done in a style similar to that heard here, was included on the later album One Long Year.

Track listing
All songs by Todd Rundgren unless otherwise indicated.
"I Saw the Light" - 3:43 from Something/Anything? (1972)
"Influenza" - 4:21 from The Ever Popular Tortured Artist Effect (1982)
"Can We Still Be Friends" - 3:36 from Hermit of Mink Hollow (1978)
"Mated" (Utopia) - 4:45  from POV (1985)
"It Wouldn't Have Made Any Difference" - 4:20 from Something/Anything? (1972)
"Love Is the Answer" - 3:53 from Oops! Wrong Planet (1977)
"Fidelity" - 4:00 from Nearly Human (1989)
"Never Never Land" (Betty Comden, Adolph Green, Jule Styne) - 2:03  originally from Peter Pan (1954) and previously on A Wizard, a True Star (1973)
"Hello It's Me" - 4:29 from Nazz (1968) and Something/Anything? (1972)
"I Want You" (Leon Ware, Arthur "T-Boy" Ross) - 4:42 originally recorded by Marvin Gaye (1976)
"A Dream Goes On Forever" - 2:59 from Todd (1974)

Personnel
Todd Rundgren - producer, engineer, arranger
Jesse Gress - guitar, arranger
Kasim Sulton - bass
John Ferenzik - keyboards
Prairie Prince - percussion

References

With A Twist
With A Twist
Albums produced by Todd Rundgren